Sig Arno (born Siegfried Aron, 27 December 1895 – 17 August 1975) was a German-Jewish film actor who appeared in such films as Pardon My Sarong and The Mummy's Hand. He may be best remembered from The Palm Beach Story (1942) as Toto, the nonsense-talking, mustachioed man who hopelessly pursues Mary Astor's Princess Centimillia.

Biography
Arno was born in Hamburg, Germany. Before beginning to make films in 1920, he was well-known in Germany as a stage comedian. He acted in 90 films in Germany – including G.W. Pabst's Pandora's Box with Louise Brooks – playing primarily comic roles, then he left Germany in 1933 due to the rise of Adolf Hitler. He worked in Europe until 1939 when he moved to Hollywood.

During the next 20 years. he appeared in over 50 films, often playing waiters, maitre d's and "funny Europeans". Arno appeared three times on Broadway, notably in the musical Song of Norway and the play Time Remembered by Jean Anouilh, for which he was nominated for a Tony Award as Best Featured Actor in a Play in 1958. In 1966, Arno won an honorary award at the German Film Awards "for his continued outstanding individual contributions to the German film over the years."

Personal life
Arno was also a successful portrait painter. He was married three times:
Caroline Dahms (1922–1932, ended in divorce, one child)
Barbara Kiranoff (1934–1953, ended in divorce)
Kitty Mattern (1953–1975, ended with his death)

Death
He died from Parkinson's disease in Woodland Hills, California on August 17, 1975, aged 79.

Partial filmography

 The Wife of Forty Years (1925)
 Cock of the Roost (1925)
 Upstairs and Downstairs (1925)
 A Woman for 24 Hours (1925)
Manon Lescaut (1926)
 The Third Squadron (1926)
 The Pride of the Company (1926)
 Circus Romanelli (1926)
 The Uncle from the Provinces (1926)
 Annemarie and Her Cavalryman (1926)
 We'll Meet Again in the Heimat (1926)
 The Armoured Vault (1926)
 Darling, Count the Cash (1926)
 Nanette Makes Everything (1926)
 The Son of Hannibal (1926)
The Love of Jeanne Ney (1927)
 The Man with the Counterfeit Money (1927)
 The Transformation of Dr. Bessel (1927)
 The Eighteen Year Old (1927)
 When the Young Wine Blossoms (1927)
 Family Gathering in the House of Prellstein (1927)
 Lützow's Wild Hunt (1927)
 A Serious Case (1927)
 The Villa in Tiergarten Park (1927)
 Marie's Soldier (1927)
 Always Be True and Faithful (1927)
 Serenissimus and the Last Virgin (1928)
 One Plus One Equals Three (1927)
 Der Ladenprinz (1928)
 Immorality (1928)
 Prince or Clown (1928)
 Tragedy at the Royal Circus (1928)
 The Orchid Dancer (1928)
 Tales from the Vienna Woods (1928)
 The Lady and the Chauffeur (1928)
 Looping the Loop (1928)
 Modern Pirates (1928)
 Her Dark Secret (1929)
 Beyond the Street (1929)
 The Girl with the Whip (1929)
 Revolt in the Batchelor's House (1929)
 We Stick Together Through Thick and Thin (1929)
 Vienna, City of Song (1930)
 Retreat on the Rhine (1930)
 The Caviar Princess (1930)
 Fairground People  (1930)
 The Widow's Ball (1930)
 Schubert's Dream of Spring (1931)
 Moritz Makes His Fortune (1931)
 Shooting Festival in Schilda (1931)
 The Night Without Pause (1931)
 A Crafty Youth (1931)
 Checkmate (1931)
 The Big Attraction (1931)
 Without Meyer, No Celebration is Complete (1931)
 Wild Cattle (1934)
 The Hunchback of Notre Dame (1939) as Tailor
 The Mummy's Hand (1940)
 Dark Streets of Cairo (1940)
 A Little Bit of Heaven (1940)
 This Thing Called Love (1940)
 The Great Awakening (1941)
 Gambling Daughters (1941)
 Two Latins from Manhattan (1941)
 Two Yanks in Trinidad (1942)
 Tales of Manhattan (1942)
 The Devil with Hitler (1942 short)
 The Palm Beach Story (1942)
 Juke Box Jenny (1942)
 His Butler's Sister (1943)
 Song of the Open Road (1944)
 The Captain from Köpenick (completed in 1941, released in 1945)
 Duchess of Idaho (1950)

References

External links

Sig Arno @ Virtual History Film (photos)

German expatriate male actors in the United States
German male stage actors
German male film actors
German male silent film actors
Deaths from Parkinson's disease
Neurological disease deaths in California
Jewish emigrants from Nazi Germany to the United States
Jewish American male actors
Male actors from Hamburg
Male actors from Los Angeles County, California
1895 births
1975 deaths
20th-century German male actors
20th-century American male actors
20th-century American Jews